Coleophora teregnathella is a moth of the family Coleophoridae. It is found in the Russian Far East.

References

teregnathella
Moths of Asia
Moths described in 2002